The 1988 ICF World Junior Canoe Slalom Championships were the 2nd edition of the ICF World Junior Canoe Slalom Championships. The event took place in La Seu d'Urgell, Spain from 8 to 10 July 1988 under the auspices of the International Canoe Federation (ICF). This was a natural whitewater course at the time, two years before the construction of the artificial Segre Olympic Park that would be used for the 1992 Summer Olympics.

Four medal events took place. No team events were held.

Medal summary

Men

Canoe

Kayak

Women

Kayak

Medal table

References

External links
International Canoe Federation

ICF World Junior Canoe Slalom Championships
ICF World Junior and U23 Canoe Slalom Championships